Albert Richards may refer to:

Albert Richards (artist) (1919–1945), British artist
Albert Richards (athlete) (1924–2003), New Zealand Olympic runner
Albert Richards (footballer) (1903–1973), English footballer
Albert G. Richards (1917–2008), American photographer and scientist
Albert Norton Richards (1821–1897), Canadian politician

See also
 Richards (surname)
 Richards (disambiguation)